Mihal Sherko (1887–1964) was an Albanian journalist, diplomat, educator and media pioneer, widely acknowledged as the founder of the Albanian Telegraphic Agency.

Biography
Sherko was born on October 27, 1887, in Korçë, a city in south-eastern Albania, then part of the Ottoman Empire. He graduated in 1915 from the Faculty of History and Philosophy at the University of Odessa, present day Ukraine. From 1915 to 1921, he was professor of Latin in the same city where he graduated. The following year, Sherko moved back to Korçë and taught at a local high school. In 1924, he was named head of the General Directorate of Education. On July 25, 1927, he was appointed director of the Press Office at the Ministry of Foreign Affairs which later was to become the Albanian Telegraphic Agency. From April 8 to 12, 1939 Sherko was member in charge of Foreign Affairs in the Provisional Administrative Committee. Later he worked as a clerk in the Liquidation Office (former MFA). From 1941 to 1943 he served as Inspector of Medicine and in the ensuing months was elected Deputy of the National Assembly, then served briefly as Minister of Popular Culture. In 1944, he was the main organizer of the automobile tourist club KTAM. Sherko was arrested the next year and was trialed at the Special Court of 1945 which sentenced him to 20 years imprisonment. He died on December 1, 1964.

Personal life
Sherko was married to Russian citizen Elena D'Arkudinski, belonging to a family of Russian aristocracy with blood ties to the Romanovs. In 1924, following the dissolution of the Russian Empire, the couple fled to Albania. They had a son named Sergej.

References

Government ministers of Albania
Culture ministers of Albania
Albanian journalists
Albanian diplomats
People from Korçë
1887 births
1964 deaths